HMS L6 was a L-class submarine built for the Royal Navy during World War I. The boat survived the war and was sold for scrap in 1935.

Design and description
The L-class boats were enlarged and improved versions of the preceding E class. They displaced  on the surface and  submerged. The L-class submarines had a crew of 35 officers and ratings.

For surface running, the boats were powered by two 12-cylinder Vickers  diesel engines, each driving one propeller shaft. When submerged each propeller was driven by a  electric motor. They could reach  on the surface and  underwater.

The boats were armed with a total of six 18-inch (45 cm) torpedo tubes. Four of these were in the bow and the remaining pair in broadside mounts. They carried 10 reload torpedoes, all for the bow tubes. They were also armed with a  deck gun.

Construction and career
HMS L3 was laid down on 19 October 1916 by William Beardmore and Company at their Dalmuir shipyard, launched on 14 January 1918, and completed on 3 July 1918. She was based at Falmouth, Cornwall in 1918.

HMS L6 was sold for scrap in January 1935 in Newport, Monmouthshire.

Notes

References
 
 
 
 

 

British L-class submarines
Ships built on the River Clyde
1918 ships
World War I submarines of the United Kingdom
Royal Navy ship names